East Ridge High School is one of two public high schools in Woodbury, Minnesota, United States, the other being Woodbury High School. It is operated by South Washington County Schools.

History
In District 833, the two public high schools Woodbury High School and Park High School were overcrowded. East Ridge was built to accommodate the population growth in the district. It was also built to unite students from the districts of two rival schools, Woodbury and Park.

Academics
East Ridge offers Advanced Placement courses (AP), along with providing courses through Century College. Students are able to receive college credit for specific courses they take at Century. East Ridge has 79 full-time faculty.

Controversies

Aaron Harper
Former principal Aaron Harper abruptly resigned in 2014, and was charged with three counts of theft by swindle in 2015 for illegally spending more than $5,000 in school-district funds for personal use during his time as principal. He pleaded guilty to one count of felony theft in 2017; the other two charges were dismissed as part of the plea agreement, and Harper agreed to pay restitution to the district.

Mike Pendino
Former varsity football coach Mike Pendino resigned in 2015, after the football program was forced to forfeit all its victories from the 2013 and 2014 seasons after it was found that an ineligible student played on the team during those seasons.

Extracurricular activities

Athletics

Club sports

Music and fine arts

Clubs

Notable alumni
Notable people who attended East Ridge High School include:
 Kendall Brown, NCAA basketball player 
 Freddie Gillespie, NBA player
 J. C. Hassenauer, NFL player

References

External links
 

Schools in Washington County, Minnesota
Public high schools in Minnesota
2009 establishments in Minnesota
Educational institutions established in 2009